Alessio Gelsini Torresi (born 17 February 1951) is an Italian cinematographer, sometimes credited as Alessio Gelsini.

Born in Rome, Gelsini made his film debut with Pier Paolo Pasolini's The Decameron in 1971. In 1991, he won the Globo d'oro,  the Grolla d'oro and the Ciak d'oro for the cinematography of Americano rosso. He also won the 1993 David di Donatello for Best Cinematography for Marco Risi's The Escort.

Selected filmography
 Bonnie and Clyde Italian Style (1983)
 Snack Bar Budapest (1988)
 Little Misunderstandings (1989)
 The Station (1990)
 Ultra (1991)
 Red American (1991)
 The Escort (1993)
 Sentimental Maniacs (1994)
 Heartless (1995)
 School (1995)
 Jack Frusciante Left the Band (1996)
 Strangled Lives (1996)
 Bedrooms (1997)
 Excellent Cadavers (1999)
 The Emperor's New Clothes (2001)
 Pontormo – un amore eretico (2004)
 Ice on Fire (2005)
 Amore che vieni, amore che vai (2008)

References

External links 
 

1951 births
Film people from Rome
Italian cinematographers
Living people
David di Donatello winners
Ciak d'oro winners